The Special Minister of State (SMOS) in the Government of the Commonwealth of Australia is a position currently held by Don Farrell since 1 June 2022, following the Australian federal election in 2022. The minister is responsible for various parliamentary, electoral, financial, public service, and oversight affairs.

Scope
The Special Minister of State administers their portfolio through the Department of Finance and a range of other government agencies, including:
 Asset Management and Parliamentary Services (Government Business, Special Claims and Land Policy Division, Property and Construction Division & Ministerial and Parliamentary Services)
 Australian Electoral Commission
 Australian Government Information Management Office (Policy and Planning Divisions & the Agency Services Division)
 Australian National Audit Office
 Australian Public Service Commission
 Commonwealth Ombudsman
 Electoral Reform
 Government Advertising
 Parliamentary Integrity
 Public Interests Disclosure
 Register of Lobbyists
 Remuneration Tribunal

List of Special Ministers of State

The following individuals have been appointed as Special Ministers of State, or any of its precedent titles:

References

External links
 

Lists of government ministers of Australia